Dawn of the Brave is the fifth studio album by the German a cappella metal band Van Canto. It was released on February 7, 2014. The album contains nine own compositions and four covers.

For the first time since their debut album, there have been no guest musicians performing in any of the tracks. However, an ensemble of 200 fans were invited to record a choir for some tracks. In the album is included "Crazy Train" from Ozzy Osbourne but is not in the track list.

Two videos were released for the album: One for "Badaboom", which features the members and other invited people dressed as metal musicians such as Lars Ulrich and Tony Iommi; and another for the Annie Lennox cover "Into the West".

The album was also released in a special earbook edition, containing many pictures of the band and of the 200 fans who recorded vocals for the album, the regular CD, the bonus CD with orchestral versions and remixes of some van Canto songs and a bonus DVD with their performance at the 2011 Wacken Open Air.

Track listing

Personnel
van Canto
Dennis Schunke (Sly) – lead vocals
Inga Scharf – lead vocals (effects)
Stefan Schmidt – lower rakkatakka vocals, wahwah solo guitar vocals (rhythm, lead on solos)
Ross Thompson – higher rakkatakka vocals (lead)
Ingo Sterzinger (Ike) – lowest dandan vocals (bass)
Bastian Emig – drums

Guest musicians
200 van Canto fans – choir
Jovian Spin – remix (track 4 on disc 2 of the Limited Mediabook)

Technical staff
Ronald Prent – mixing

References 

2014 albums
Napalm Records albums
Van Canto albums
Albums produced by Charlie Bauerfeind